Lennox Stephen "Bunny" Butler (9 February 1929 - 1 September 2009) was a West Indian international cricketer who played in one Test match, in 1955.

References

1929 births
2009 deaths
West Indies Test cricketers
Cricketers from Port of Spain
Trinidad and Tobago cricketers